Libá (until 1948 Libštejn) is a municipality and village in Cheb District in the Karlovy Vary Region of the Czech Republic. It has about 800 inhabitants.

Administrative parts
The village of Hůrka is an administrative part of Libá.

References

Villages in Cheb District